Electrical muscle stimulation (EMS), also known as neuromuscular electrical stimulation (NMES) or electromyostimulation, is the elicitation of muscle contraction using electric impulses. EMS has received an increasing amount of attention in the last few years for many reasons: it can be utilized as a strength training tool for healthy subjects and athletes; it could be used as a rehabilitation and preventive tool for people who are partially or totally immobilized; it could be utilized as a testing tool for evaluating the neural and/or muscular function in vivo; it could be used as a post-exercise recovery tool for athletes. The impulses are generated by a device and are delivered through electrodes on the skin near to the muscles being stimulated. The electrodes are generally pads that adhere to the skin. The impulses mimic the action potential that comes from the central nervous system, causing the muscles to contract. The use of EMS has been cited by sports scientists as a complementary technique for sports training, and published research is available on the results obtained. In the United States, EMS devices are regulated by the U.S. Food and Drug Administration (FDA).

A number of reviews have looked at the devices.

Uses 

Electrical muscle stimulation can be used as a training, therapeutic, or cosmetic tool.

Physical rehabilitation
In medicine, EMS is used for rehabilitation purposes, for instance in physical therapy in the prevention muscle atrophy due to inactivity or neuromuscular imbalance, which can occur for example after musculoskeletal injuries (damage to bones, joints, muscles, ligaments and tendons). This is distinct from transcutaneous electrical nerve stimulation (TENS), in which an electric current is used for pain therapy. In the case of TENS, the current is usually sub-threshold, meaning that a muscle contraction is not observed. 

For people who have progressive diseases such as cancer or chronic obstructive pulmonary disease, EMS is used to improve muscle weakness for those unable or unwilling to undertake whole-body exercise. EMS may lead to statistically significant improvement in quadriceps muscle strength, however, further research is needed as this evidence is graded as low certainty. The same study also indicates that EMS may lead to increased muscle mass. Low certainty evidence indicates that adding EMS to an existing exercise programme may help people who are unwell spend fewer days confined to their beds. 

During EMS training, a set of complementary muscle groups (e.g., biceps and triceps) are often targeted in alternating fashion, for specific training goals, such as improving the ability to reach for an item.

Weight loss
The FDA rejects certification of devices that claim weight reduction. EMS devices cause a calorie burning that is marginal at best: calories are burnt in significant amount only when most of the body is involved in physical exercise: several muscles, the heart and the respiratory system are all engaged at once. However, some authors imply that EMS can lead to exercise, since people toning their muscles with electrical stimulation are more likely afterwards
to participate in sporting activities as the body becomes ready, fit, willing and able to take on physical activity.

Effects 
"Strength training by NMES does promote neural and muscular adaptations that are complementary to the well-known effects of voluntary resistance training". This statement is part of the editorial summary of a 2010 world congress of researchers on the subject. Additional studies on practical applications, which came after that congress, pointed out important factors that make the difference between effective and ineffective EMS. This in retrospect explains why in the past some researchers and practitioners obtained results that others could not reproduce. Also, as published by reputable universities, EMS causes adaptation, i.e. training, of muscle fibers. Because of the characteristics of skeletal muscle fibers, different types of fibers can be activated to differing degrees by different types of EMS, and the modifications induced depend on the pattern of EMS activity. These patterns, referred to as protocols or programs, will cause a different response from contraction of different fiber types. Some programs will improve fatigue resistance, i.e. endurance, others will increase force production.

History 
Luigi Galvani (1761) provided the first scientific evidence that current can activate muscle. During the 19th and 20th centuries, researchers studied and documented the exact electrical properties that generate muscle movement. It was discovered that the body functions induced by electrical stimulation caused long-term changes in the muscles. In the 1960s, Soviet sport scientists applied EMS in the training of elite athletes, claiming 40% force gains. In the 1970s, these studies were shared during conferences with the Western sport establishments. However, results were conflicting, perhaps because the mechanisms in which EMS acted were poorly understood. Medical physiology research pinpointed the mechanisms by which electrical stimulation causes adaptation of cells of muscles, blood vessels and nerves.

Society and culture

United States regulation 
The U.S. Food and Drug Administration (FDA) certifies and releases EMS devices into two broad categories: over-the counter devices (OTC), and prescription devices. OTC devices are marketable only for muscle toning; prescription devices can be purchased only with a medical prescription for therapy. Prescription devices should be used under supervision of an authorized practitioner, for the following uses:

 Relaxation of muscle spasms;
 Prevention or retardation of disuse atrophy;
 Increasing local blood circulation;
 Muscle re-education;
 Immediate post-surgical stimulation of calf muscles to prevent venous thrombosis;
 Maintaining or increasing range of motion.

The FDA mandates that manuals prominently display contraindication, warnings, precautions and adverse reactions, including: no use for wearer of pacemaker; no use on vital parts, such as carotid sinus nerves, across the chest, or across the brain; caution in the use during pregnancy, menstruation, and other particular conditions that may be affected by muscle contractions; potential adverse effects include skin irritations and burns

Only FDA-certified devices can be lawfully sold in the US without medical prescription. These can be found at the corresponding FDA webpage for certified devices. The FTC has cracked down on consumer EMS devices that made unsubstantiated claims; many have been removed from the market, some have obtained FDA certification.

Devices

Non-professional devices target home-market consumers with wearable units in which EMS circuitry is contained in belt-like garments (ab toning belts) or other clothing items.

The Relax-A-Cizor was one brand of device manufactured by the U.S. company Relaxacizor, Inc.

From the 1950s, the company marketed the device for use in weight loss and fitness.  Electrodes from the device were attached to the skin and caused muscle contractions by way of electrical currents. The device caused 40 muscular contractions per minute in the muscles affected by the motor nerve points in the area of each pad. The directions for use recommended use of the device at least 30 minutes daily for each figure placement area, and suggested that the user might use it for longer periods if they wished. The device was offered in a number of different models which were powered either by battery or household current.

Relax-A-Cizors had from 1 to 6 channels. Two pads (or electrodes) were connected by wires to each channel. The user applied from 2 to 12 pads to various parts of their body. For each channel there was a dial which purported to control the intensity of the electrical current flowing into the user's body between the two pads connected to that channel.

As of 1970, the device was manufactured in Chicago, Illinois, by Eastwood Industries, Inc., a wholly owned subsidiary of Relaxacizor, Inc., and was then distributed throughout the country at the direction of Relaxacizor, Inc., or Relaxacizor Sales, Inc.

The device was banned by the United States Food and Drug Administration in 1970 as it was deemed to be potentially unhealthy and dangerous to the users. The case went to court, and the United States District Court for the Central District of California held that the Relax-A-Cizor was a "device" within the meaning of 21 U.S.C. § 321 (h) because it was intended to affect the structure and functions of the body as a girth reducer and exerciser, and upheld the FDA's assertions that the device was potentially hazardous to health.

The FDA informed owners of Relax-A-Cizors that second-hand sale of Relax-A-Cizors was illegal, and recommended that they should destroy the devices or render them inoperable.

Slendertone is another brand name.  the company's Slendertone Flex product had been approved by the U.S. Food and Drug Administration for over-the-counter sale for toning, strengthening and firming abdominal muscles.

See also
 Electroacupuncture
 Functional electrical stimulation
 Microcurrent electrical neuromuscular stimulator
 Transcutaneous electrical nerve stimulation

References

Further reading
 
 
  Google document inspired by a workshop by author
  It is compiled to serve as a practical guide to understanding electrical muscle stimulation for sport training, and is supplemented by material taught by the author during workshops, and by appendices written by professional trainers.

Athletic training
Electrotherapy
Medical treatments
Physical exercise